The 1981 Chattanooga Moccasins football team represented the University of Tennessee at Chattanooga as a member of the Southern Conference (SoCon) in the 1981 NCAA Division I-A football season. The Moccasins were led by second-year head coach Bill Oliver and played their home games at Charmerlain Field. They finished the season 7–3–1 overall and 3–2–1 in SoCon play to tie for fourth place.

Schedule

References

Chattanooga
Chattanooga Mocs football seasons
Chattanooga Moccasins football